Jax is a commune in the department of Haute-Loire in south-central France.

Population

See also
Communes of the Haute-Loire department
 Chastenuel

References

Communes of Haute-Loire